Severin Films is an American film production and distribution company known for restoring and releasing cult films on DVD and Blu-ray.

History
The label was created in 2006 in Los Angeles, and other offices were founded in New York City and London.

Filmography

Severin Films' releases includes Enzo G. Castellari's The Inglorious Bastards (1978), Walerian Borowczyk's Immoral Women (1979), Dennis Hopper's Out of the Blue (1980), Jesús Franco's Bloody Moon (1981) and Macumba Sexual (1981), Gwendoline: Unrated Director's Cut (1984), Shocking Dark (1989) Hardware (1990), and The Hairdresser's Husband (1990). Severin Films is also known for distributing the 2010 film Birdemic: Shock and Terror.

References

External links

Mass media companies established in 2006
2006 establishments in California
Companies based in Los Angeles
Film distributors of the United States
Film production companies of the United States
Home video lines